Island School is a private, co-educational, college-preparatory school in Lihue, Hawaii, United States. It is located behind the University of Hawaii's Kauai Community College campus.

History 
In January 1977, Island School began with 12 students ranging up to eighth grade. Within four years, enrollment was up to 68 and its high school had been established. By 1983, Island School had graduated only eight students and the high school was disestablished. In 1996, the high school was re-opened due to rising enrollment. Island School began graduating seniors again starting with the Class of 2000. Today, Island School is a fully accredited college preparatory institution. Graduates have been accepted at such institutions as MIT, Yale, Wheaton, Babson, and Ithaca in the East; Oberlin, Denison, Purdue and Creighton in the Midwest; Stanford, University of Southern California, Pomona College, Reed, Gonzaga, Lewis and Clark, Trinity College (Connecticut), University of the Pacific, University of San Diego, Loyola Marymount University, University of Idaho, and the University of Nevada in the West; the University of Hawai`i, Hawai`i Pacific University and Chaminade in Hawai`i.

In September 1991, the campus was moved from Kealia (on the east side) to its present location in Puhi. Island School used several portable classrooms at the Puhi campus, all of which were destroyed by Hurricane Iniki in September 1992. Other buildings were obliterated or severely damaged by the hurricane. The school re-opened 11 days later by utilizing various off-campus facilities scattered around the island. The permanent campus at Puhi was entirely restored within two years.

Academic Program 
Island School's academic program takes its impetus from Howard Gardner's ideas of multiple intelligences. In other words, in addition to verbal and mathematical knowledge, each human is capable of realizing his or her potential in music and art, in self-understanding and social interactions, in physical strength and coordination (as in athletics), and in making discoveries (as in science). Island School divides its school year into three trimesters. In High School there are a variety of classes to choose from. For example, math classes range from Algebra through Calculus 2.

Hawaiian Studies 
All students receive instruction in  Hawaiian Studies. This includes the culture, language, history and music of Native Hawaiians as well as Hawaiian geography. The value of aloha is extended to include akahai (kindness), lokahi (unity), oluolu (pleasantness), haahaa (humility) and ahonui (patience). Participation in Native Hawaiian sports is emphasized during Makahiki (Thanksgiving).

As early as fifth grade, students take overnight trips to the Big Island of Hawaii to study Hawaiian culture, as it was before the 18th-century arrival of foreign influences.

References

External links 
 

Private K-12 schools in Hawaii
High schools in Kauai County, Hawaii
Schools in Kauai County, Hawaii
Educational institutions established in 1977
1977 establishments in Hawaii